Aaj Ki Angaarey is a 1988 Hindi action thriller film directed by Vinod K. Varma, starring Hemant Birje, Archana Puran Singh, Om Shivpuri and Rohini Hattangadi.

Plot 
A school bus was kidnapped by a group of masked men during a trip for ransom. However, the kids and their teacher managed to outsmart the kidnappers and escape from captivity.

Cast 
 Hemant Birje as Masked man
 Archana Puran Singh as Priya
 Om Shivpuri as Forest Officer Ranjit Singh
 Sarala Yeolekar as Sarparti, Ranjit Singh's wife
 Raza Murad as Police Inspector (Sonia's dad)
 Rohini Hattangadi as Sonia's mom

Soundtrack
The songs were composed by Bappi Lahiri and written by Anjaan.

References

External links
 

1988 films
1980s Hindi-language films
Films scored by Bappi Lahiri
Indian action thriller films